Mar Kyi Shay is a 2014 Burmese comedy film, directed by Mike Tee starring Moe Aung Yin, Ye Aung, Soe Myat Thuzar and Wutt Hmone Shwe Yi.

Cast
Moe Aung Yin as Aung Aung
Ye Aung as U Pe Khin
Soe Myat Thuzar as Daw Mya Nwe
Wutt Hmone Shwe Yi as Nan
Gandawin as Khin Hnaung Pyae
Khay Mi Mi Ko as Nat Mi Mal
Stella as Stella
Mos as U Kyar Yoe
Kin Kaung as Maung Nge
Kyaw Htoo as Maung Gyi

References

2014 films
2010s Burmese-language films
Burmese comedy films
Films shot in Myanmar
2014 comedy films